Romanovsky District is an administrative and municipal district (raion), one of the thirty-eight in Saratov Oblast, Russia. It is located in the west of the oblast. Its administrative center is the urban locality (a work settlement) of Romanovka. Population: 16,226 (2010 Census);  The population of Romanovka accounts for 44.8% of the district's total population.

References

Notes

Sources

Districts of Saratov Oblast